Triebtenseewli is a lake near Grimsel Pass in the Canton of Berne, Switzerland. Its surface area is 10 ha.

See also
List of mountain lakes of Switzerland

References

Triebten
Bernese Oberland
LTriebtenseewli
Lakes of the canton of Bern